Butler is the name of a noble family whose members were, for several centuries, prominent in the administration of the Lordship of Ireland and the Kingdom of Ireland. They rose to their highest prominence as Dukes of Ormonde. The family has produced multiple titles such as Baron Cahir, Baron Dunboyne, Viscount Ikerrin, Viscount Galmoye, Viscount Mountgarret, Viscount Thurles, Earl of Carrick, Earl of Kilkenny, Earl of Ormond, Earl of Ossory, Marquess of Ormonde and Duke of Ormonde. Variant spellings of the name include le Boteler and le Botiller. The Butlers were descendants of Anglo-Norman lords who participated in the Norman invasion of Ireland in the 12th century. The surname has its origins in the hereditary office of "Butler (cup-bearer) of Ireland", originating with Theobald Walter, 1st Chief Butler of Ireland. The arms of later family members depicted three cups in recognition of their original office.

Origin

The family descended from Theobald Walter (d. 1205), eldest son of Hervey Walter and Maud de Valoignes. During the reign of Henry II of England Theobald held the position of pincerna (Latin) or boteillier (Norman French), the ceremonial cup-bearer or butler to Prince John, Lord of Ireland. He also held the office of Chief Butler of England and was the High Sheriff of Lancashire during 1194.

His younger brother Hubert Walter (c.1160-1205) became the Archbishop of Canterbury and Justiciar and Lord Chancellor of England.

Butlers of Ormond

The Ormond line is the senior branch of the family and later produced the Earls, Marquesses and Dukes of Ormond.

Edmund Butler was created the first Earl of Carrick in 1315 in reward for his service during the Bruce campaign in Ireland. Although the earldom did not pass to his son James, the latter was created the first Earl of Ormond in 1328 by Edward III.

Subsidiary titles for the earl in the Peerage of Ireland were later added: Earl of Ossory (1538) and Viscount Thurles (1536). James Butler, 12th Earl of Ormond served as the commander of the Cavalier forces in Ireland and was made Marquess of Ormond in 1642, which title became extinct in 1758. He was made Duke of Ormonde in 1661, and with the title created in the Peerage of England in 1682; after 1682, the spelling "Ormonde" was used almost universally. Subsidiary titles for the duke in the Peerage of England were added: Earl of Brecknock (1660) and Baron Butler (1660).

James Fitzjames Butler succeeded his grandfather and became the second duke. Accused of treason during the Jacobite rising of 1715, he was attainted and his English peerages declared forfeit.  In 1758 his brother Charles, the de jure third duke (Irish), died and the dukedom and marquessate became extinct.

The eighteenth earl, James Wandesford Butler, was created as Baron Ormonde of Llanthony, in the county of Monmouth in the Peerage of the United Kingdom in 1821 on the coronation of George IV. Later, he was created the Marquess of Ormonde in the Peerage of Ireland in 1816. On his death in 1820, that title became extinct and the earldoms passed to his brother, for whom the title "Marquess of Ormonde" was re-created in the Peerage of the United Kingdom in 1825.  That title became extinct in 1997, while the earldom became dormant.

Lands

The family seat, since 1391, was Kilkenny Castle; their main estate was previously at Gowran Castle. From Kilkenny, the Butlers claimed overlordship of the surrounding Gaelic kingdoms of Ormond, Éile, Ikerrin and part of Osraige.

The patrimony of the Butlers of Ormond encompassed most of the modern counties of Tipperary, Kilkenny and parts of County Carlow. Only the earldom of Desmond would have had more extensive land holdings than Ormond in the Lordship and Kingdom of Ireland. Following the successful Norman Invasion, the ancient Gaelic lands would have been annexed to the crown and passed as baronies or fiefs to the supporters of the crown (the victorious barons). These (administrative) baronies corresponded to the (Irish) túath ("country") or trícha cét ("thirty hundred [men]") of a Gaelic chief, for example Éile. However, sometimes baronies combined small territories, or split a large one, or were created without regard for the earlier boundaries.  In the Norman period most Gaelic chiefs were killed, expelled, or subordinated by the new Norman lord; in the Tudor period, many Gaelic and Hibernicized lords retained their land by pledging allegiance to the Crown under the policy of surrender and regrant.

In 1837, the remains of the following Butler castles were recorded in County Kilkenny alone by Lewis. 

Members of the Butler family continued to live in Kilkenny Castle until 1935.

Notable family members

 Theobald Walter, 1st Chief Butler of Ireland (died 1206) married Maud de Vavasour; they had three children
 Theobald le Botiller, 2nd Chief Butler of Ireland (died 1230) married Joan de Marais
 Theobald Butler, 3rd Chief Butler of Ireland (1224–1248) married Margaret de Burgh; they had four children
 Theobald Butler, 4th Chief Butler of Ireland (1242–1285) married Joan FitzJohn FitzGeoffrey; they had three children
 Edmund Butler, Earl of Carrick (1270–1321) married Joan FitzGerald, Countess of Carrick; they had two children
 James Butler, 1st Earl of Ormond (1305–1338) married Eleanor de Bohun; they had six children
 James Butler, 2nd Earl of Ormond (1331–1382) married Elizabeth Darcy; they had five children
 James Butler, 3rd Earl of Ormond (died 1405) married Anne Welles; they had five children
 James Butler, 4th Earl of Ormond (1392–1452) married Joan de Beauchamp; they had three children
 James Butler, 5th Earl of Ormond (1420–1461)
 John Butler, 6th Earl of Ormond (died 1478)
 Thomas Butler, 7th Earl of Ormond (1426–1515) married Anne Hankford

Butlers of Dunboyne
The Baron Dunboyne peerage originated with Thomas Butler, 1st Baron Dunboyne (1271–1329), the son of Theobald Butler, 4th Chief Butler of Ireland.

Notable family members
 Thomas Butler, 1st Baron Dunboyne (1271–1329) 
 John Butler, 12th Baron Dunboyne (1731 – May 7, 1800)

Butlers of Clonamicklon and Ikerrin
This branch sprang from John Butler of Clonamicklon (1305–1330), the youngest son of Edmund Butler, Earl of Carrick (1268–1321) and Joan FitzGerald, Countess of Carrick (1282–1320).He was the brother of James Butler, 1st Earl of Ormond (1305–1337). From this branch descended the Viscounts Ikerrin and the Earls of Carrick (of the second creation).

Notable family members
 Pierce Butler, 4th Viscount Ikerrin (1679–1711). He married twice. First to the Hon. Alicia Boyle then to Olivia St. George
 Thomas Butler, 6th Viscount Ikerrin (1683–1720). He married Margaret Hamilton. They had one child. He was born in Kilkenny, Ireland.
 Somerset Hamilton Butler, 1st Earl of Carrick (1718–1774). He married Lady Juliana Boyle. They had one child. The 8th Viscount was created Earl of Carrick – the second time that an earldom of that name was created for the Butler family. The first creation was for Edmund Butler, Earl of Carrick.
 Henry Butler, 2nd Earl of Carrick (1746–1813). He married Sarah Taylor. They had two children. He died in Kilkenny, Ireland.
 Somerset Butler, 3rd Earl of Carrick (1779–1838), brother of the Hon. Henry Edward Butler (1780–1856) he married twice and had five children
 Gina Fratini (Georgina Butler, 1931–2017), the English fashion designer, was the granddaughter of Charles Butler, 7th Earl of Carrick

Butlers of Cahir

This branch sprang from James Butler, 3rd Earl of Ormond (died 1405). The family seat, Cahir Castle, is built on an island in the River Suir. Much of the  barony of Iffa and Offa West was controlled by the Butler Barons Cahir.

Notable family members
 Thomas Butler of Cahir (died 1476)

Barons of the first creation
 Thomas Butler, 1st Baron Cahir (died 1558), son of Thomas Butler of Cahir. His brother Piers Butler would later supply future barons when his own line failed to produce any other male heirs upon the death of his own son. 
 Edmund Butler, 2nd Baron Cahir (died 1560)

Barons of the second creation
 Theobald Butler, 1st Baron Cahir (died 1596), son of Piers Butler and nephew of the 1st Baron. 
 Thomas Butler, 2nd Baron Cahir (died 1627), son of the 1st Baron. Died without a male heir. 
 Thomas Butler, 3rd Baron Cahir, son of Piers Butler, nephew of the 2nd Baron and grandson of the 1st Baron.

Butlers of Polestown and Roscrea
This branch also sprang from the 3rd Earl. Three distinct branches are associated with this branch of the family. The family tree splits firstly with Edmund MacRichard Butler; his eldest son, Sir James, founded the most illustrious sub-branch with his progeny going on to supply the 8th Earl of Ormond; his second son, Walter, founded the lesser sub-branch with his progeny going on to become baronets of Polestown. This sub-branch split thirdly to found a Roscrea branch in the barony of Ikerrin, County Tipperary, beginning with Walter's grandson.

Note: "Polestown" is also spelled in the records as Poolestown". It is now identified with the town of Paulstown in Gowran, County Kilkenny.

Notable family members
 Sir Richard Butler of Polestown (1395–1443)
 Walter Butler of Polestown (died 1483)
 Sir Richard Butler (Poletown) (died 1619)
 Edmond Butler of Polestown (died 1636)
 Peter Butler of Roscrea
 Walter Butler of Roscrea

Butlers of Mountgarret, Cloughgrennan, Kilcash & Duiske

The common ancestor here is Piers Butler, 8th Earl of Ormond. Three minor family branches sprang from his eldest son – James; Cloughgrenan, Kilcash and Duiske / Galmoye,  His younger son, Richard Butler, founded the junior but long lasting Mountgarret line.

Senior line - earls of Ormond, heirs of the 8th earl
Mountgarret line - heirs of the second son of the 8th earl
Cloughgrenan line - heirs of the second son of the 9th earl
Kilcash and Thurles line - heirs of the third son of the 9th earl
Garryricken line - heirs of the third son of the 11th earl
Duiske and Galmoye line - heirs of the 10th earl

Butlers of Mountgarret
Mountgarret may take its name from the townland of Tifeaghna (Mount Garret) in the civil parish of Sheefin, in the barony of Galmoy or from Clomantagh (Mount Garret) in the civil parish of Clomantagh in the County of Crannagh. Both baronies are in the northwestern corner of County Kilkenny. The Viscounts are recorded as significant landowners there (where they occupied lands around Clomantagh Castle for many centuries), as well as holding lands in the neighbouring civil parish of Coolcashin.  It may also refer to a district of the town of New Ross in County Wexford. This branch was in turn an offshoot of the Polestown branch.

Notable family members

 Richard Butler, 1st Viscount Mountgarret (1500–1571)
 Edmund Butler, 2nd Viscount Mountgarret (died 1602)
 Richard Butler, 3rd Viscount Mountgarret (1578–1651)
 Edmund Butler, 4th Viscount Mountgarret (1595–1679)
 Edmund Butler, 10th Viscount Mountgarret (died 1752)
 Edmund Butler, 11th Viscount Mountgarret (1745–1793)
 Edmund Butler, 1st Earl of Kilkenny (1771–1846)
 Henry Butler, 13th Viscount Mountgarret (1816–1900)
 Henry Butler, 14th Viscount Mountgarret (1844–1912)
 Edmund Butler, 15th Viscount Mountgarret (1875–1918)
 Piers Butler, 16th Viscount Mountgarret (1903–1957)
 Richard Butler, 17th Viscount Mountgarret (1936–2004)
 Piers Butler, 18th Viscount Mountgarret (born 1961)

Butlers of Cloughgrenan
The second son of James Butler, 9th Earl of Ormond was Sir Edmund Butler of Cloughgrenan who occupied lands at Cloughgrenan (a townland near Carlow town). Tulleophelim (or Tullowphelim) is near the town of Tullow in County Carlow. The castle of Tulleophlim had been built by James Butler, 4th Earl of Ormond before 1450.

Notable family members
 Sir Edmund Butler of Cloughgrenan (c. 1531 – 1602), 
 Theobald Butler, Viscount Butler of Tulleophelim, a son of Sir Edmund.
 Sir Thomas Butler of Cloughgrenan, 1st Baronet, illegitimate son of Sir Edmund.
 Sir Edmund Butler of Cloughgrenan, 2nd Baronet, son of 1st Baronet.

Butlers of Kilcash and Thurles

The third son of James Butler, 9th Earl of Ormond, was John who occupied lands in Kilcash, near Clonmel, County Tipperary. His heirs went on to provide four immediate heirs to the earldom of Ormond when the senior line failed through lack of legitimate male issue.

Notable family members
 John Butler of Kilcash
 Walter Butler, 11th Earl of Ormond, son of John and the first member of the Kilcash branch to inherit the earldom when the senior branch failed to leave legitimate male issue.
 Thomas Butler, Viscount Thurles, son of the 11th Earl who predeceased his father.
 James Butler, 1st Duke of Ormonde, heir of Thomas, grandson of the 11th earl.
 Thomas Butler, 6th Earl of Ossory, son of the 1st Duke who predeceased his father.
 James Butler, 2nd Duke of Ormonde, son of the 6th Earl of Ossory and grandson of the 1st Duke.
 Charles Butler, 3rd Duke of Ormonde, younger son of the 6th Earl of Ossory.
 Richard Butler of Kilcash, son of Viscount Thurles and younger brother of James, the 1st Duke.

Butlers of Garryricken
This branch is an offshoot of the Kilcash branch. Garryricken is a townland in the barony of Kells, County Kilkenny.

Notable family members

 Walter Butler of Garryricken, eldest son of Richard Butler of Kilcash, great-grandson of the 11th Earl.  
 Colonel Thomas Butler of Garryricken, eldest son of Walter.
 John Butler, 15th Earl of Ormonde, son of Colonel Thomas, great-grand-nephew of the 1st Duke. He succeeded to the earldom (but not the dukedom) when the last member of senior Kilcash line, Charles, failed to produce a legitimate male heir.
 John Butler of Garryricken, second son of Walter and brother of Colonel Thomas, grand-nephew of the 1st Duke.
 Walter Butler, 16th Earl of Ormonde, son of John, great-great-great-grandson of the 11th Earl and the first cousin of the 15th Earl.

Butlers of Duiske and Galmoye
Duiske takes its name from Duiske Abbey in Graiguenamanagh, County Kilkenny. Galmoy is a village in the Barony of Galmoy, northwestern Kilkenny. This branch also sprang from the 9th Earl. His younger son was James Butler of Duiske.

Notable family members
 James Butler of Duiske was awarded the Abbey lands upon the Dissolution of the Monasteries following the English Reformation. The lands eventually reverted to his uncle Thomas Butler, 10th Earl of Ormond. 
 Piers FitzThomas Butler of Duiske, who was the illegitimate son of the 10th Earl.
 Edward Butler, 1st Viscount Galmoye, who was the son of Piers FitzThomas Butler.
 Piers Butler of Duiske, who was the eldest son of the 1st Viscount.
 Edward Butler, 2nd Viscount Galmoye, who was the grandson of the 1st Viscount.
 Piers Butler, 3rd Viscount Galmoye, who was the eldest son of the 2nd Viscount. He was attainted and had no living male heirs.
 Richard Butler of Galmoye, who was the second son of the 2nd Viscount.
 James Butler of the Irish Brigade in France was son of Richard Butler of Galmoye and the grandson of the 2nd Viscount.
 Edmond Butler of Killoshulan, who was the brother of the 2nd Viscount.

Sub-families and houses 

House Butler was a large dynasty with many titles, large amounts of land and a considerable amount of wealth, with close ties to the royal families of England and later other countries. Consequently, it has numerous descendants and sub-houses throughout the world, particularly in Ireland, Scotland, Wales and England.

For example, Lady Margaret Butler of Kilkenny Castle was married to Sir William Boleyn of Blickling Hall and Hever Castle and was the grandmother of Queen Anne Boleyn, wife of Henry VIII of the House of Tudor, connecting the Butler family to the Tudor dynasty. The Butler family has expanded going to America.

See also
 Irish nobility
 Baron Dunboyne
 Baron Butler
 Butler baronets
 Inislounaght Abbey
 Butler–FitzGerald dispute
 Butler of Scotland

Family tree

References

Bibliography
Empley, C A, The Butler lordship in Ireland (1970), Trinity College (Dublin, Ireland)